Max Lacroix (9 February 1913 6 January 2009) was a distinguished French actuary best known as a founder of the Groupe Consultatif Actuariel Européen.

References 

1913 births
2009 deaths
French actuaries
Recipients of the Legion of Honour